The Corporate Technology Directory also known as the CorpTech directory of technology companies was a directory of technology companies published from 1986-2004 by CorpTech. It listed thousands of technology companies including software, services, and hardware as well as developers.

The directory was later made available in digital form as a cd and subsequently database subscription.

See also
 Major Information Technology Companies of the World

References

Directories
1986 non-fiction books